Ghost Alley Espresso is a coffee shop at Seattle's Pike Place Market, in the U.S. state of Washington. The business operates on Post Alley in a former service room for bathroom attendants, a few steps away from the Gum Wall. Current owner Michael Buchwald purchased the business from Mercedes Carrabba, who used the shop as a starting location for ghost tours. The space is reportedly haunted by the ghost of Arthur Goodwin, a former manager of Pike Place Market.

Description 

Located at Pike Place Market in Seattle's Central Waterfront, Ghost Alley Espresso operates under an arch on Post Alley. The space previously served as a bathroom attendants' room. In 2015, Rosemary Behan of The National described Ghost Alley Espresso as a "gorgeous, almost miniature-sized one-off coffee shop that uses the high-tech Modbar system – allowing it to mimic any espresso machine in the world by changing the settings".

The Los Angeles Times has called the business a "hole-in-the-wall coffee joint". In Leslie Budewitz's 2013 fiction book Peppermint Barked: A Spice Shop Mystery, the shop is described as a "hidey-hole carved from a former storage and rest station for Market vendors".

Ghost Alley Espresso serves coffee drinks with an emphasis on unusual flavors such as "salty nut" and turmeric mochas. The shop has a small counter with a few stools, and has served as a starting point for ghost tours.

History 

Michael Buchwald is the owner of Ghost Alley Espresso. Previously, Mercedes Carrabba owned both Ghost Alley Espresso and Market Ghost Tours. In 2014, Christopher Reynolds of the Los Angeles Times credited Carrabba for converting "a 147-square-foot closet into this snug caffeine haven and tour-guide headquarters".

In 2020, Carrabba read excerpts from her book Market Ghost Stories at Ghost Alley Espresso and other reportedly haunted locations at Pike Place Market. Rachael Jones of Seattle Refined has said of the haunt:

In 2013, Ghost Alley Espresso participated in the Post Alley Hooley, a "neighborhood party" presented by the business and resident group Post Alley Project. The coffee shop was one of two in Seattle with a Modbar system, as of 2015. During the COVID-19 pandemic, the business accepted orders via the front window.

Reception 
Ghost Alley Espresso has been recommended in multiple editions of the Not for Tourists Guide to Seattle. In 2017, Rebecca Mongrain of Seattle Refined said Ghost Alley served the city's best mocha. Reviews in Eater, The Infatuation, and the Seattle Metropolitan have all encouraged readers to visit Ghost Alley Espresso instead of the Original Starbucks.

See also 

 List of reportedly haunted locations in the United States

References

External links 

 
 Ghost Alley Espresso at Pike Place Market
 Ghost Alley Espresso at Zomato

Central Waterfront, Seattle
Coffee in Seattle
Coffeehouses and cafés in Washington (state)
Pike Place Market
Reportedly haunted locations in Washington (state)
Restaurants in Seattle